Yona Atari (December 4, 1933 – March 11, 2019) was an Israeli singer and actress.

Biography
Born in Sana'a and the first out of eight children, Atari and her family moved to Israel when she was three months old. She was brought up in Rehovot. Atari was sent by her mother to study music and theatre but her father forbade this since these pastimes were considered to be idolatry. At the age of 15, Atari moved to Tel Aviv where she resided in Kerem HaTeimanim under the guidance of Nahum Nardi who introduced her to Esther Gamlielit. In 1950, she joined up with the Nahal Troupe and between 1951 and 1955, she studied acting at the Habima Theatre.

In 1957, Atari joined up with Batzal Yarok before starring in a play written by Haim Hefer and Dahn Ben-Amotz. She also participated in an theatrical adaption of Sammy Gronemann’s King Solomon and the Shoemaker alongside Rachel Attas and Illi Gorlitzky in 1964. She teamed up with the latter once again and they performed the song Concertina and a Guitar. Atari began to focus more of her attention on acting and starred in adaptations of The Dybbuk, Medea, The Threepenny Opera and more.

On television, Atari was a prominent cast member on Rechov Sumsum from 1983 until 1987.

Personal life
Atari was the older sister of radio personality Shosh Atari and singer Gali Atari. She was married to El Al and Air Force pilot Uri Yaffe from 1960 until his death on June 10, 2012. They had two children, Dana and Oren.

Death
Atari died on March 11, 2019, in Tel Aviv following complications from Alzheimer's disease at the age of 85. Her coffin was put on display at the Cameri Theatre for the funeral service before being laid to rest at Yarkon Cemetery.

References

External links

1933 births
2019 deaths
People from Sanaa
People from Rehovot
Yemeni emigrants to Mandatory Palestine
Israeli people of Yemeni-Jewish descent
Yemenite Jews in Israel
Jewish Israeli actresses
Jewish Israeli musicians
Israeli Mizrahi Jews
Israeli stage actresses
Israeli television actresses
Israeli film actresses
20th-century Israeli women singers
20th-century Israeli actresses
Deaths from dementia in Israel
Deaths from Alzheimer's disease
Burials at Yarkon Cemetery